Alucita chloracta is a species of moth of the family Alucitidae. It is known from Benin.

References

Alucitidae
Moths of Africa
Moths described in 1908
Taxa named by Edward Meyrick